Scombrops gilberti, is a species of marine ray-finned fish, a gnomefish from the family Scombropidae. It is found in the Western Pacific Ocean where it has been recorded off Hokkaido South to Suruga Bay. The specific name honours the American ichthyologist Charles Henry Gilbert (1859-1928).

References

Scombropidae
Fish described in 1901
Taxa named by David Starr Jordan